Kenny Watson (born 5 January 1956) is a Scottish former professional footballer who is best known for his time with Partick Thistle.

Watson started his career a Montrose in 1973 and moved to Rangers three years later. He made his debut as a substitute against Partick Thistle in a League Cup match on 18 October 1976. His first goal also came against Thistle in a 2–1 league defeat on 30 October. After five seasons, 94 appearances and six goals, Watson left for Firhill.

References

External links
Scotland U21 stats at Fitbastats

Living people
Footballers from Aberdeen
Association football midfielders
Montrose F.C. players
Rangers F.C. players
Partick Thistle F.C. players
Scottish footballers
1956 births
Scottish Football League players
Scotland under-21 international footballers